ICAA may refer to:

 Argentine Catholic Apostolic Church (Iglesia Católica Apostólica Argentina), a derivative movement of the Brazilian Catholic Apostolic Church
 Industrial Conciliation and Arbitration Act 1894, a piece of industrial relations legislation passed by the Parliament of New Zealand in 1894
 Institute of Chartered Accountants in Australia, the professional accounting body representing Chartered Accountants in Australia
 Institute of Cinematography and Audiovisual Arts (Instituto de la Cinematografía y de las Artes Audiovisuales), a project of the Spanish  Ministry of Culture and Sport
 The Institute of Classical Architecture and Art, an American organization dedicated to the promotion of traditional and classical architecture and crafts.